Lakeside Packers is a beef producer based in Brooks, Alberta. It is owned by JBS Canada, a subsidiary of JBS S.A., a Brazilian protein company.

History

BSE Aid
As of June 2004, Lakeside Packers had received roughly $33 million Canadian dollars in financial aid from the Government of Alberta since a cow with bovine spongiform encephalopathy was found on an Alberta farm in May 2003.

2005 labour dispute

Lakeside Packers was unionized under the United Food and Commercial Workers (UFCW) as of the early 1980s, and members were local Alberta residents who strongly supported their union local. But then there was a strike that began in 1984 and lasted about 18 months.  It is not said how the union came to be decertified in that time.

Workers at the plant later certified the UFCW Local 401 as their bargaining agent.  Following a round of talks in 2005 the workers voted in favour of strike action, eventually settling after 3 weeks of job action.

A minority of workers voted against unionization of the plant. Most workers were happy with plant staff and managers and known UFCW 401 was looking out for their own interests. During the talks in 2005, Lakeside staff were falsely informed by UFCW 401 about improvements to conditions to the work force. After the strike action, most members in favour of UFCW 401 quit immediately from working at the plant. Main complaint for quitting was the new work conditions and lack of pay.

Sale to XL Foods
As of March 2009, Lakeside Farm Industries, Ltd. was sold by Tyson to XL Foods, it is reported that Lakeside and its assets were sold to XL Foods Inc. for approximately $107 million.

Sale to JBS Canada

XL Foods sold the Lakeside Packers plant to JBS Canada on January 14, 2013.

References

External links
Lakeside Packers website

Brooks, Alberta
Canadian subsidiaries of foreign companies
Companies based in Alberta
Meat companies of Canada
JBS S.A. subsidiaries
Food and drink companies based in Alberta